The Sportscar Vintage Racing Association (SVRA) is an American automobile club and sanctioning body that supports vintage racing in the United States. The organization was founded in 1981, and is regarded as the premier vintage racing organization in the U.S.

Along with conducting official race meets, SVRA events also include car shows, auto auctions, vendors, and other activities promoting the "car culture". The organization encourages the restoration, preservation, and racing of historically significant automobiles that are configured as closely as possible to their original design and construction.

Venues
The 2021 SVRA season comprises 17 events at road courses across the country:

 Auto Club Speedway
 Brainerd International Raceway
 Circuit of the Americas
 Charlotte Motor Speedway
 Hutchinson Island
 Laguna Seca
 Lime Rock Park
 Mid-Ohio Sports Car Course
 Portland International Raceway
 Road America
 Road Atlanta
 Sebring International Raceway
 Sonoma Raceway
 The Ridge Motorsports Park
 Utah Motorsports Campus
 Virginia International Raceway
 Watkins Glen International

Former venues include:

 Amelia Island
 Roebling Road Raceway
 Tail of the Dragon
 Willow Springs International Raceway

The SVRA runs a "triple crown" for historic sports cars, the Vintage Race of Champions.  These three events are the organisation's marquee events and the VROC, featuring pro-am fields, is featured in these three venues:
 Virginia International Raceway
 Indianapolis Motor Speedway (Indy Legends Charity Pro–Am race)
 Road Atlanta

The VROC is suspended for 2021 because of fan restrictions amid the COVID-19 pandemic.

Race car groups
The SVRA currently recognizes 12 car groups, with criteria based on car type, age, engine displacement, horsepower, original class placement, and other various technical specifications. The organization largely requires participants to keep the cars as true to their original form as possible, however, certain modern safety modifications are required.

Group 1

Recognized small displacement production sports cars and sedans
Examples:
 Sprite
 Midget
 Mini Cooper
 Triumph Spitfire
 Alfa Romeo Giulietta
 MGA
 Fiat-Abarth
 Lotus 7
 Select G and H-modifieds and D-Sports Racers, Formula Vee

Group 2

Pre-1973 Formula cars.
Examples:
 Lotus
 Brabham
 Caldwell
 Titan
 Crosslé
 Merlyn
 Royale
 Elva
 Hawke

Group 3

Recognized series-produced sports cars and sedans in production prior to 1972.
Examples:
 MGB
 Triumph TR3 and TR4
 Austin-Healey 3000
 Porsche 356
 Elva Courier
 Morgan
 Daimler
 Sunbeam Alpine
 Volvo P1800

Group 4

Limited produced sports cars, racing "specials" and GT cars built or in production prior to 1960.
Examples:
 Scarab
 Devin
 Maserati
 Ferrari
 Lotus
 Jaguar XK120/140, C, D
 Lister
 Allard
 Elva
 Porsche RSK Spyder
 Cunningham

Group 5

World Sports Car Championship and World Manufacturer's Championship GT's and prototypes as raced between 1960 and 1972. USRRC sports cars and Can-Am cars as raced before 1969 with invited later models. Front engine "specials" as raced after 1959.
Examples:
 Lotus 23, 30, 40
 Porsche 904, 906, 907, 910
 Elva Mk 6, 7, 8
 Ford GT40
 McLaren
 Lola T70, T160
 McKee
 Chevron

Group 6

Selected big-bore production sports cars and sedans through 1972. This is the group that is utilized for the Vintage Race of Champions (VROC) pro-am series, which includes the Indy Legends Charity Pro–Am race at the Indianapolis Motor Speedway.
Examples:
 Chevrolet Corvette
 Shelby GT-350
 AC Cobra
 Ford Mustang
 Chevrolet Camaro
 Jaguar XKE
 Plymouth Barracuda
 Mercury Cougar
 Griffith
 Porsche 911
 AMC Javelin
 AMC AMX

Group 7

World Championship for Makes sports cars as raced after 1970 on slicks. Under 2.0-liter sports cars as raced after 1972. Center-seat Can-Am cars. SCCA, ASR & BSR, Sports 2000.
Examples:
 McLaren
 Porsche 908, 917, 956, 962
 Lola
 Chevron
 Ferrari 312, 512
 Alfa Romeo T33
 Lancia
 Matra

Group 8

Recognized series-produced sports cars and sedans in production prior to 1979, and later cars by invitation.
Examples:
 Lotus Super 7
 Datsun 240Z
 BMW 2002
 Sunbeam Tiger
 Porsche 911, 914, 924, 944
 Datsun 510
 Escort
 Alfa Romeo GTV

Group 9

Wings and slicks formula cars complying with SVRA post-1973 formula car regulations.
Examples:
 Formula 1 and Indy Lights
 Formula 5000
 Formula 2
 Formula Atlantic & Formula B (1600cc)
 Formula Super Vee (1600cc, air & water cooled)
 Formula Continental and Formula 3 (1100cc)

Group 10

Selected IMSA and FIA/GT sports cars and sedans as raced between 1973 and 1999. NASCAR Cup/Busch series stock cars. Production-based contemporary cars.
Examples:
 Porsche RSR, 934, 935, 964, 993
 Chevrolet Corvette
 Chevrolet Monza
 Chevrolet Camaro
 Ford Mustang T/A
 Nissan
 Toyota
 Mazda RX-7

Group 11
GTP/Group C, ALMS, PSCR, WSC, Grand Am, and WeatherTech Championship prototype cars as raced from 1981 to five years before the current date.  SVRA may permit cars that are deemed obsolete by rules, such as the 2003-16 Daytona Prototype chassis, made obsolete after the 2016 season, before the five-year rule is applied. Tube frame Trans Am and IMSA GTS, GTO and FIA-GT cars as raced from 1981 to specified cut-off date (five years, but SVRA may permit cars once their GT3/GT4 homologation has expired to participate). Production-based contemporary cars based on performance history as raced from 1999 to 5 years prior to calendar year or homologation has expired (car cannot be used in current sportscar racing). Can-Am and A Sports Racing cars as raced after 1967 on slicks, over 6.0 Liters. Center-seat Can-Am cars on slicks over 5.0 Liters.
Examples:
Aston Martin AMR1
Intrepid
Audi R8
Daytona Prototype 2003-16 (now legal per SVRA)
Ford Mustang
Trans Am
Oldsmobile Aurora
Pontiac Grand Am
Porsche GT2 and Cup

Group 12
Select GT sports cars and sedans raced between 1973 and 5 years prior to today's date or when homlogation has expired. These are Production-based cars such as the IMSA Michelin Pilot Challenge or any other stock / prepared racing series once their homologation has expired. Early IMSA GTO and GTU small bore cars will be accepted on an individual basis.  SVRA may permit a car no longer permitted in the Pilot Challenge or other similar series to participate in SVRA without regards to the five-year rule.
Examples:
Chevrolet Corvette,
Dodge Viper
Ford Mustang
Panoz,
Datsun Z cars
Nissan ZX
various BMW, Porsche and Ferrari models

Annual Awards
 Driver of the Year
 Rookie of the Year
 Most Improved Driver
 Professional Mechanic
 Amateur Mechanic
 Bob Prouty Award
 BUBBA Award
 Bucher/Decker Trophy
 Charlie Gibson Award
 Collier Cup
 Cornett Cup
 Glanville Cup
 Handy Cup
 Hugh Kleinpeter Award
 MGT Cup
 Sports Racer Challenge
 VIR Founders Cup

United States Vintage Racing National Championship
On October 25–27, 2013, SVRA held the inaugural United States Vintage Racing National Championship at the Circuit of the Americas near Austin, Texas. 500 vintage race cars competed in twelve classes with a national champion crowned in each class.

References

External links

Official website
SVRA Flickr Group
Opinion article on historic racing
Gallery of 2004 SVRA racing at Watkins Glen

Historic motorsport events
Auto racing organizations in the United States
Companies based in DeKalb County, Georgia